The Darkening Age: The Christian Destruction of the Classical World is a 2017 book by Catherine Nixey. In the book, Nixey argues that early Christians deliberately destroyed classical Greek and Roman cultures and contributed to the loss of classical knowledge. The book was an international bestseller, was translated into 12 languages and was a New York Times Notable Book of 2018. The New York Times called it a “ballista-bolt of a book”. The book received positive reviews from academics such as Peter Frankopan, professor of Global History at Oxford University, Tim Whitmarsh, professor of Greek culture at Cambridge University, and others who praised its style and originality. It received criticism from scholars of late antiquity and the Middle Ages, who accused it of telling a simplistic, polemical narrative and exaggerating the extent to which early Christians suppressed aspects of older Greek and Roman cultures.

Content
After expressing the opinion that traditional historical narratives tend to depict pre-Christian Rome in an unfavorable light (chilly and nihilistic), Nixey proceeds to describe what she sees as an attack by Christians against classical heritage during Late Antiquity, which is a period generally encompassing the Later Roman Empire and the Early Middle Ages. The assault she alleges is both physical and cultural, taking the reader from the murder of Hypatia in 415 and the destruction of pagan statues, to the closing of temples and destruction of books.

For Nixey, these episodes of violent religious zeal are explained by a widely promoted belief that pagan religions actually harbored demons, and also by the powerful rhetoric Christian leaders used against the enemies of the early church. In that sense, she thinks the foundations of later religious persecution were laid at that time.

Reception

Among the general public
The Darkening Age was chosen as one of The New York Times''' "Notable Books" for 2018 and was listed on "book of the year" lists by The Telegraph, The Spectator, The Observer, and BBC History''.

The book received widespread positive reviews, including in the New York Times, The Spectator, and The Times. A.C. Grayling named it as his favourite book of the last 12 months.

Among scholars

Peter Frankopan, professor of Global History at Oxford University and director of the Oxford Centre for Byzantine Research, said that “Catherine Nixey has written a bold, dazzling and provocative book that challenges ideas about early Christianity and both how - and why - it spread so far and fast in its early days. Nixey is a witty and iconoclastic guide."

Emily Wilson, Professor of Classical Studies at the University of Pennsylvania, reviewing it in the New Statesman called it "[A] vivid and important new book... Nixey is a funny, lively, readable guide through this dark world of religious oppression.”  

Professor Edith Hall, a professor of Classics at King's College London, described the work as "Engaging and erudite... offer[ing[ both a compelling argument and a wonderful eye for vivid detail" and "a triumph" in an interview with Nixey to promote the book.

However historians who specialise in the periods Nixey's narrative covers have been less enthusiastic. Peter Thonemann, a professor of ancient history at the University of Oxford, argues that Nixey's work is problematic, and that "the argument depends on quite a bit of nifty footwork", because Nixey makes a large number of broad generalizations based on limited evidence. He also states that the deliberate destruction of ancient temples by Christians "seems to have been exceptionally rare in real life" and that the Christian book-burning was always directed towards heretical or "magical" writing, and not towards classical literature.

Professor Tim Whitmarsh of Cambridge University described it as "a finely crafted, invigorating polemic against the resilient popular myth that presents the Christianisation of Rome as the triumph of a kinder, gentler politics. On those terms, it succeeds brilliantly". He also cautions that the work risks being one-sided. He said it represented a reversion to Edward Gibbon's view of the Christians as instigators of the fall of Rome. "In seeking to expose the error and corruption of the early Christian world, Nixey comes close to veiling the pre-Christian Romans’ own barbarous qualities," he said.

Medieval historian at the University of Exeter Levi Roach says "perhaps most worryingly Nixey ends up endorsing the long-debunked view of the Middle Ages as a period of blind faith and intellectual stagnation” and notes “it is hard not to detect a degree of anti-Christian animus." 

Former Professor of Late Antique and Byzantine History at the University of Oxford, Dame Averil Cameron, says "Catherine Nixey is a lively writer and likely to go far, .... but unfortunately in her first book she has rather unimaginatively bought into the old ‘blame the Christians’ model. She drives it through with a steely-eyed determination, unrelieved by nuance or counter-argument." Cameron says "a quick look at the citations in Nixey’s footnotes shows what she has been reading .... with several references to the same names from among a small group of like-minded historians equally hostile to Christianity." She concludes "it is a shame that Nixey has been encouraged to over-react .... so dramatic­ally and to produce such an overstated and unbalanced counterblast" and says Nixey's book is "a travesty".  

Richard Tada, PhD in ancient Greek and Byzantine history from the University of Washington, states that Nixey ventured "into areas where she is clearly out of her depth". Consequently, her book is "a shoddy work that fails to make the grade even as a polemic". He suggests that one of Nixey's attempts to blame Christians for the supposed destruction of classical world is "simply dishonest". Tada criticized the book for having "cherrypicked" incidents without considering contrary evidence; Tada argues that many of the examples of Christian "oppression" in Nixey's book have misrepresented the sources she cited, which instead point to political repression which was not unique to Christian emperors, or class-based conflicts in which Christians fought on both sides.

Philip Jenkins argued that "No serious academic historian is likely to support" Nixey’s view of history.

Accolades 
The book won second prize in the 2015 Royal Society of Literature Jerwood Awards for Non-Fiction  and the Morris D. Forkosch Book Award for the Best Humanist Book of 2018.

See also
 Persecution of pagans in the late Roman Empire

References

2017 non-fiction books
21st-century history books
Macmillan Publishers books
Houghton Mifflin books
Books about ancient Christianity